The Central Buckeye Conference is an OHSAA athletic league whose members are located in the Ohio counties of Champaign, Clark, Logan, Madison, and Union.  The league was established in the fall of 1974.

Current members

Former members

Membership Timeline
Kenton Trail Division members are in red, Mad River Division members are in blue, and former members are in green.

History

The CBC was established in time for the 1974-75 school year.  The present-day divisions were created to align schools based on size, and every sport recognizes a champion for each division.
The charter members of the Central Buckeye Conference were Bellefontaine, Greenon, London, Northeastern, Shawnee, and Urbana.

In 1977, New school Kenton Ridge joined the CBC becoming the 7th member.

In 1978, London left the CBC after 4 years for the now defunct Central Buckeye League bringing the CBC back to 6 members.

Northwestern would join the CBC in 1982 bringing the conference back to 7 members which would eventually grow to 8 when Tecumseh joined in 1991 from the Greater Miami Valley Conference.

The CBC would remain at 8 members until they added 5 new members in Benjamin Logan, Graham, Miami East and Tippecanoe from the Southwestern Rivers Conference, Indian Lake from the Three Rivers Conference, while Northeastern left for the Ohio Heritage Conference bringing the total number of members to 12.

Miami East would leave to join the Cross County Conference in 2006. They would eventually be replaced by Stebbins who joined in 2007.

The CBC would remain at 12 members until 2016 when both Stebbins and Tippecanoe left to join the Greater Western Ohio Conference. Leaving the CBC with 2 divisions of 5 teams each.

In July 2017, both London's and North Union's Board of Educations have approved their membership for the CBC. London will join the Kenton Trail Division with Bellefontaine, Jonathan Alder, Kenton Ridge, Shawnee, and Tecumseh. North Union will join the Mad River Division with Benjamin Logan, Graham, Indian Lake, Northwestern, and Urbana. Date of entry is undetermined. This move brought the CBC back to 12 members allowing for 2, 6 team divisions which allows for easier scheduling.

Sponsored Sports
The CBC supports 22 league sports for both male and female competition. This includes football, boys' and girls' basketball, boys' and girls' track & field, boys' and girls' cross country, boys' and girls' soccer, boys' and girls' golf, boys' and girls' swimming, boys' and girls' bowling, boys' and girls' tennis, baseball, softball, volleyball, wrestling, cheerleading

League champions for each sport are recognized in both the Kenton Trail Division and Mad River Divisions. The CBC also awards an all sports trophy as well.

Football Championships

All Sports Trophy

References

External links
Central Buckeye Conference Home Page

Ohio high school sports conferences